II is the second album of the Hungarian electronic band, Compact Disco. It was released in 2011 by Hungarian independent record label CLS Music.

Track listing
 "Always On My Mind" 4:09
 "Beautiful Day" 3:46
 "Feel The Rain" 3:55
 "Fly With You" 4:21
 "I Feel Love" 3:52
 "I'm Gonna Get You" 3:38
 "Going To Forget" 4:05
 "One More Day" 3:34
 "A Part Of You" 3:50
 "Leave It Up To Me" 3:55

Personnel
 Behnam Lotfi – loops, grooves, effects, recording (music), composer, lyricist, producer
 Gábor Pál – keyboards, recording (music), composer, lyricist, producer
 Attila Sándor – bass, guitars, recording (music), producer, cover design
 Csaba Walkó – lead and backing vocals, recording (music), composer, lyricist, producer
 Gábor Deutsch (aka. Anorganik) – mixing and mastering
 Gábor Némethy – recording (vocals)
 Georgina Győrik – lyricist on Feel The Rain
 Ádám Temesi – cover photography

References

Compact Disco albums
2011 albums